Waterford Village Historic District is a  historic district in Waterford, New York that was listed on the National Register of Historic Places in 1977.

The district dates to 1799 and includes Greek Revival, Late Victorian, and Federal architecture.

The listing included 330 contributing buildings and one other contributing structure.

The village area is located at the junction of the Mohawk and Hudson Rivers.  It was settled in 1633 and became the first incorporated village in the state in 1794.  It is the southern terminus of the Champlain Canal and the eastern terminus of the Erie Canal.

References

External links
 Walking Tour of the Village of Waterford

Gallery

Historic districts in Saratoga County, New York
Historic districts on the National Register of Historic Places in New York (state)
Federal architecture in New York (state)
Greek Revival architecture in New York (state)
Victorian architecture in New York (state)
National Register of Historic Places in Saratoga County, New York